Dosti Zindabad is an Indian Hindi-language drama film directed by Partho Ghosh and produced by Ashish Maheshwari and his wife, Shruti Maheshwari. The film features Dev Sharma, Rahuul Chuwdhary, Shraddha Sharma and Shakti Kapoor in the lead roles. It was released on 22 November 2019.

Cast 
 Dev Sharma as Sunny
 Rahuul Chuwdhary as Angad
Shakti Kapoor
Mohan Joshi
Ayub Khan
Kiran Kumar
Shraddha Sharma
Ahsan Khan
 Sakshi Maggo as Sonia

References

External links 

2019 films
2010s Hindi-language films